Pedro Redovalho Clerot (born 27 January 2007) is a Brazilian racing driver set to compete in the 2023 F4 Spanish Championship for MP Motorsport.

Career

Karting
Clerot started his racing career in karting in 2016. In a short time, he was proclaimed three-time champion of Brasilia, in the 2018, 2019 and 2021 seasons and won the Brazil Open Cup twice in 2020 and 2021.

Formula 4

2022
In 2022, Full Time Sports announced that Clerot would compete in the inaugural season of the F4 Brazilian Championship in 2022, where in 18 races, he won 7 races, and scored 4 pole positions, 7 fastest laps, 11 podiums and add 276 points. As a result, he became the first driver's champion of the new F4 championship. Clerot also participated in the FIA Motorsport Games in the Formula 4 category with Team Brazil, managing to qualify twice in fourth place. However, he finished in ninth position in the main race due to a 5-second penalty for having exceeded the limits of the track on 6 different occasions.

2023
On 6 December 2022, it was announced that Clerot signed with MP Motorsport for the 2023 F4 Spanish Championship. He competed with that team in the 2023 Formula 4 UAE Championship.

Racing record

Racing career summary

References

External links
 

2007 births
Living people
Brazilian racing drivers
Sportspeople from Brasília
FIA Motorsport Games drivers
MP Motorsport drivers
Italian F4 Championship drivers
Spanish F4 Championship drivers
UAE F4 Championship drivers